Shawkemo (also Middle Field Land, Shawaukema, or The) is a village in Nantucket, Massachusetts, United States. The name Shawkemo is an Indian word meaning "middle field of land".

References

Villages in Massachusetts
Villages in Nantucket, Massachusetts
Populated coastal places in Massachusetts